Ernest M. Miller (November 26, 1890 – June 13, 1941) was a justice of the Iowa Supreme Court from December 27, 1937, to December 13, 1938, appointed from Shelby County, Iowa.

References

External links

Justices of the Iowa Supreme Court
1890 births
1941 deaths
20th-century American judges